Nepalese language may refer to:
Nepali language, or Gorkhali, the official language of modern Nepal
Newari language, or Nepal Bhasa, the historical language of Kathmandu

See also
Languages of Nepal